The 1912 Ottoman coup d'état (17 July 1912) was a military coup in the Ottoman Empire against the Committee of Union and Progress (CUP) government (elected during the 1912 general elections) by a group of military officers calling themselves the Saviour Officers (Modern ) during the dissolution era of the Ottoman Empire.

The Saviour Officers are often referred to as the military wing of the Freedom and Accord Party (Liberal Union or Liberal Entente), the main opposition party after the 1912 election, which became notorious for electioneering and voter fraud by the CUP. Freedom and Accord members recruited elements such as the officers to their cause in protest. The coup was one of the central events of the politically volatile 1912–13 years, which saw political instability due to the power struggle between the CUP and Freedom and Accord, as well as the newly sparked Balkan Wars.

Background 

The Young Turks were a revolutionary movement that was the main force behind the Young Turk Revolution. The revolution resulted in the Sultan Abdulhamid II announcing the restoration of the Ottoman constitution of 1876 on 3 July 1908. The 1908 election put the CUP into the government as majority party, while the main minority was the LU. The 31 March Incident (13 April 1909) was an attempt to dismantle the Constitutional Era and replace it with an autocracy under Sultan/Caliph Abdul Hamid II. The countercoup was put down by the Action Army (Hareket Ordusu). However, the CUP didn't fully control the government, and elements in the country became alarmed at the manner in which the CUP had rigged the elections in their favor. Moreover, because of the Italo-Turkish War in Libya and the start of Albanian revolt, CUP lost its former support and prestige.

A group of officers led by CUP member Mehmed Sadık would separate from the CUP, accusing central committee members Mehmed Talat, Mehmed Cavid, and Hüseyin Cahid of being seduced by Zionism and Freemasonry. Cavid would subsequently resign his post as minister of finance. A meeting in October by all of the parliament's major politicians thwarted cooperation between liberals and the CUP, thus increasing polarization and resulted in the creation of the Freedom and Accord Party, also known as the Liberal Union. After the notoriously contested and violent 1912 elections against the LU, CUP increased its power and formed the vast majority of the parliament.

Talat, who was suspicious of war minister Mahmud Şevket Pasha, urged for his resignation which offended parts of the army. That summer, another Albanian revolt broke out, this time with support of Albanian officers in the army.

Coup 
By June, Colonel Sadık and staff major Gelibolulu Kemal (later surnamed Şenkil) would form the Savior Officers (Halâskâr Zâbitân) clique, and requested President of the Ottoman Assembly Halil Bey to disband the CUP dominated parliament. Mahmud Şevket Pasha's resignation in support of the Savior officers left the CUP isolated, and the Unionists acquiesced.

The new government, known as the "Great Cabinet", was formed by Gazi Ahmed Muhtar Pasha, a war hero. The members of the government were prestigious statesmen, and they easily received the vote of confidence. The CUP, notwithstanding its majority in the parliament, lost its executive power. Although Ahmed Muhtar Pasha and his cabinet were non-partisan, the Saviour Officers pressured Ahmed Muhtar Pasha's government to adjourn the parliament, losing CUP its last stronghold.

Aftermath
Beginning in the summer of 1912, Ottoman Empire was governed by Saviour-backed governments. However, in October, the Balkan Wars began, and the Ottoman Empire was defeated on all fronts. This gave CUP chance to regain strength. In January 1913, the leadership of the CUP staged a coup, forcing the Saviour-backed Freedom and Accord government to resign at gunpoint. The leaders of the Saviour Officers escaped to Egypt and Albania. CUP governments continued up to the end of the First World War.

References

Sources 
  (Google Books)
 

Coup
July 1912 events
Military coups in the Ottoman Empire
Ottoman coup
1910s coups d'état and coup attempts